is a Japanese badminton player from the Saishunkan team. She was the girls' doubles gold medalist at the 2016 World Junior Championships in Bilbao, Spain partnered with Sayaka Hobara. Matsuyama won her first senior international title in Thailand at the 2017 Smiling Fish International tournament with Chiharu Shida.

Achievements

BWF World Junior Championships 
Girls' doubles

Asian Junior Championships 
Girls' doubles

BWF World Tour (9 titles, 9 runners-up) 
The BWF World Tour, which was announced on 19 March 2017 and implemented in 2018, is a series of elite badminton tournaments sanctioned by the Badminton World Federation (BWF). The BWF World Tour is divided into levels of World Tour Finals, Super 1000, Super 750, Super 500, Super 300, and the BWF Tour Super 100.

Women's doubles

BWF International Challenge/Series (1 title) 
Women's doubles

  BWF International Challenge tournament
  BWF International Series tournament
  BWF Future Series tournament

References

External links 
 

1998 births
Living people
Sportspeople from Fukuoka Prefecture
Japanese female badminton players